The WWE Hall of Fame is a hall of fame which honors professional wrestlers and professional wrestling personalities maintained by WWE. Originally known as the "WWF Hall of Fame", it was created in 1993 when André the Giant was posthumously inducted with a video package as the sole inductee that year. The 1994 and 1995 ceremonies were held in conjunction with the annual King of the Ring pay-per-view events and the 1996 ceremony was held with the Survivor Series event. After an eight-year hiatus and after the World Wrestling Federation (WWF) had been renamed to World Wrestling Entertainment (WWE) in 2002, the promotion relaunched the Hall of Fame in 2004 and has held the ceremonies in conjunction with WrestleMania ever since. Since 2005, portions of the induction ceremonies have aired on television and since 2014, the entire ceremonies have aired on the WWE Network, which was extended to Peacock in 2021 after the American version of the WWE Network merged under Peacock that year.

As of 2022, there have been 234 inductees, with 124 wrestlers inducted individually, 46 Legacy inductees, 18 group inductions (consisting of 51 wrestlers within those groups), 12 celebrities, and 8 Warrior Award recipients. Eight wrestlers have been inducted twice (individually and as part of a tag team/group): Ric Flair, Shawn Michaels, Booker T, Bret Hart, Hulk Hogan, Scott Hall, Kevin Nash, and Sean Waltman (Waltman's two inductions were both as a member of a group, D-Generation X and the New World Order). 59 members have been inducted posthumously.

History
The World Wrestling Federation (WWF) established the WWF Hall of Fame in 1993. It was first announced on the March 22, 1993 episode of Monday Night Raw where André the Giant, who had died nearly two months prior, was announced as the sole inductee. In the proceeding two years, induction ceremonies were held in conjunction with the annual King of the Ring pay-per-view events. The 1996 ceremony was held with the Survivor Series event, for the first time in front of a paying audience as well as the wrestlers, after which, the Hall of Fame went on hiatus.

In 2002, the WWF was renamed to World Wrestling Entertainment (WWE) and the promotion relaunched the now WWE Hall of Fame in 2004 to coincide with WrestleMania XX. This ceremony, like its predecessors, was not broadcast on television, though highlights were shown at the WrestleMania event followed by the inductees appearing on the entrance stage in a condensed ceremony, which would become a Hall of Fame tradition from that point forward. The full version was released on DVD on June 1, 2004. Beginning with the 2005 ceremony, an edited version of the Hall of Fame was broadcast on Spike TV (2005) and on the USA Network (2006–present); these were aired on tape delay. Since 2005, the entire Hall of Fame ceremony has been packaged as part of the annual WrestleMania DVD release, and from 2014, has been broadcast live on the WWE Network streaming service. The 2021 ceremony, however, was pre-taped on March 30 and April 1 and aired on April 6. In addition to the WWE Network in international markets, the event also aired on Peacock in the United States after the American version of the WWE Network had merged under Peacock in March that year.

Although a building has never been built to represent the Hall of Fame, WWE has looked into constructing a facility. In 2008, Shane McMahon, then-Executive Vice President of Global Media of WWE, stated that WWE had been storing wrestling memorabilia in a warehouse for years, with all items categorized and dated in case a facility is created. Ric Flair stated in 2020 that WWE was in the process of creating a building for the Hall of Fame and that it would be in Florida in the Orlando area, but plans had been delayed due to the COVID-19 pandemic.

Specialty inductees

Celebrity wing
The "celebrity wing" of the Hall of Fame is dedicated to celebrities that have made memorable appearances on WWE programming, and/or have had longtime associations with WWE, who have been very successful in other fields.

Warrior Award

In 2015, WWE introduced the Warrior Award for those who have "exhibited unwavering strength and perseverance, and who live life with the courage and compassion that embodies the indomitable spirit of the Ultimate Warrior."

While WWE promotes Warrior Award recipients as Hall of Fame inductees, they are not included in the Hall of Fame section at WWE.com and an image gallery which shows "every WWE Hall of Famer ever" does not contain any recipient.

The award was created following the Ultimate Warrior's death. During his April 2014 Hall of Fame speech shortly before his death, he proposed that there be a special category called the "Jimmy Miranda Award" for WWE's behind-the-scenes employees. Miranda, who died in 2002, was part of the WWE merchandise department for more than 20 years. Former WWE ring announcer Justin Roberts expressed disappointment at how WWE used portions of Warrior's Hall of Fame speech to promote the award but left out Warrior's intentions of honoring WWE's off-screen employees. WWE responded, "It is offensive to suggest that WWE and its executives had anything, but altruistic intentions in honoring Connor and his legacy with The Warrior Award", adding that "moving forward the award will be given annually to acknowledge other unsung heroes among WWE's employees and fans". Since 2019 all recipients have been either current or former WWE employees.

Traditionally, Dana Warrior, the widow of the Ultimate Warrior, presents the award.

Legacy inductees
In 2016, WWE introduced a new category for the Hall of Fame called the "Legacy" wing. Inductees in this category are from several eras of wrestling history, going back to the early 20th century. All but two inductees, Hisashi Shinma and MSG Network creator Joseph Cohen, have been inducted posthumously. Legacy inductees are recognized with a video package at the ceremonies.

The Legacy wing also has some criticism around it, specifically regarding the abbreviated way of the inductions. Journalist Dave Meltzer said "this is the category they (WWE) use to honor people who, for whatever reason, they don't feel are marketable names to the modern audience to put in their actual Hall of Fame". Promoter and manager Jim Cornette criticized the fact that recognizable names like Jim Londos or El Santo were part of a video package. Legacy inductees are not announced before the ceremonies and families of posthumous inductees are not notified of their inductions. This practice has been criticized by family members of Legacy inductees Bruiser Brody and Ethel Johnson.

Classes

Class of 1993

WWF Hall of Fame (1993) was the inaugural class of the WWE Hall of Fame. During the March 22, 1993 episode of Monday Night Raw a video package announcing André the Giant's induction was shown. No ceremony took place, and André was inducted posthumously. In March 2015 a condensed version of the 1994 ceremony was added to the WWE Network. Due to no original ceremony, the 1993 induction of André was discussed by Gene Okerlund and Renee Young as part of the 1994 commentary.

Class of 1994

WWF Hall of Fame (1994) was the event that featured the introduction of the second class to the WWE Hall of Fame. The event was produced by the WWF on June 9, 1994, from the Omni Inner Harbor International Hotel in Baltimore, Maryland.

In March 2015 a condensed version of the ceremony was added to the WWE Network. Due to the original ceremony only being partially recorded and not originally intended to air, Gene Okerlund and Renee Young host the program with added commentary.

Class of 1995

WWF Hall of Fame (1995) was the event that featured the introduction of the third class to the WWE Hall of Fame. The event was produced by the WWF on June 24, 1995, from the Marriott Hotel in Philadelphia, Pennsylvania. The event took place the same weekend as King of the Ring.

In March 2015 a condensed version of the ceremony was added to the WWE Network. Due to the original ceremony only being partially recorded and not originally intended to air, Gene Okerlund and Renee Young host the program with added commentary.

The 1995 class featured two posthumous inductees. Antonino Rocca was presented by his wife, and The Grand Wizard was represented by Bobby Harmon.

Class of 1996

WWF Hall of Fame (1996) was the event which featured the introduction of the fourth class to the WWE Hall of Fame. The event was produced by the WWF on November 16, 1996, from the Marriott Marquis in New York City, New York. The event took place the same weekend as Survivor Series.

In March 2015 a condensed version of the ceremony was added to the WWE Network. Due to the original ceremony only being partially recorded and not originally intended to air, Gene Okerlund and Renee Young host the program with added commentary.

Due to Vincent J. McMahon's death in 1984, he was posthumously inducted by the McMahon family.

Class of 2004

Class of 2005

 Class headliners appear in boldface

Class of 2006

 Class headliners appear in boldface

Class of 2007

 Class headliners appear in boldface

Class of 2008

 Class headliners appear in boldface

Class of 2009

 Class headliners appear in boldface

Class of 2010

 Class headliners appear in boldface

Class of 2011

 Class headliners appear in boldface

Class of 2012

 Class headliners appear in boldface

Class of 2013

 Class headliners appear in boldface

Class of 2014

 Class headliners appear in boldface

Class of 2015

 Class headliners appear in boldface

Class of 2016

 Class headliners appear in boldface

Class of 2017

 Class headliners appear in boldface

Class of 2018

 Class headliners appear in boldface

{| class="wikitable"
!Category
!Inductee
!Inducted by
|-
| rowspan="5" |Individual
|Goldberg'|Paul Heyman
|-
|Ivory
|Molly Holly
|-
|Jeff Jarrett
|Road Dogg
|-
|Hillbilly Jim
|Jimmy Hart
|-
|Mark Henry
|Big Show
|-
|Group
| The Dudley Boyz(Bubba Ray & D-Von Dudley)
| Edge & Christian
|-
|Warrior Award
|Jarrius "JJ" Robertson
|Dana Warrior
|-
|Celebrity
|Kid Rock
|Triple H
|-
| rowspan="10"|Legacy
|Stan Stasiak
| rowspan="10"|N/A
|-
|Lord Alfred Hayes
|-
|Dara Singh
|-
|Cora Combs
|-
|El Santo
|-
|Jim Londos
|-
|Rufus R. Jones
|-
|Sputnik Monroe
|-
|Boris Malenko
|-
|Hiro Matsuda
|}

Class of 2019

 Class headliners appear in boldfaceClass of 2020
 
Due to the COVID-19 pandemic, the 2020 Hall of Fame ceremony did not take place. As such, the Class of 2020 was inducted alongside the Class of 2021 at the 2021 ceremony.
 Class headliners appear in boldfaceClass of 2021

 Class headliners appear in boldfaceClass of 2022

 Class headliners appear in boldface To be inducted 

Class of 2023

 Class headliners appear in boldfaceFuture class

Ceremony dates and locations

Reception
Omissions and refused inductions

In 2012, The Post and Courier columnist Mike Mooneyham noted that the Hall has garnered criticism due to the inductions of questionable performers, and the omissions of major names within the industry. Bob Backlund declined induction multiple times, and The Ultimate Warrior wrote that he refused the honor in 2010; they were eventually inducted in 2013 and 2014, respectively. Randy Savage was long recognized as being noticeably absent; Chris Jericho said that the Hall achieved a level of legitimacy by inducting Savage in 2015. Mick Foley long described Vader as "the most glaring and obvious omission from the #WWEHOF"; this was later corrected when he was posthumously inducted as part of the Class of 2022. Chyna is also a topic of conversation of whether or not she should be inducted due to the nature of her post-WWE career, Ultimately, she was posthumously inducted as a member of D-Generation-X in 2019, although fans, family and fellow wrestlers have since started petitioning for her solo posthumous induction.

Bruno Sammartino, the longest-reigning WWWF World Heavyweight Champion, was once critical of the Hall of Fame. Sammartino disapproved of celebrity inductees such as Pete Rose and William Perry, and said of the ceremony: "What's the point to a Hall of Fame? Is it a building I can actually go to? No. Give me a break". Sammartino declined previous induction offers, before accepting in 2013. Paul Levesque (Triple H) said that it was important for Sammartino to be inducted from a "legitimacy standpoint" and ESPN said that his induction was an opportunity to legitimize the Hall of Fame. After being announced as an inductee, Sammartino said he considered the Hall to be legitimate.

In December 2021, Jeff Hardy was released from WWE. On March 8, 2022, the day that Hardy's no-compete clause expired, WWE reached out to Hardy and offered him an inductee spot to the WWE Hall of Fame (2022) ceremony. Jeff Hardy declined the offer because he was offended, felt like it wasn't time yet and he wanted Matt Hardy to be inducted alongside him.

Quality of inductees

Ric Flair has stated there are several wrestlers in the Hall of Fame that didn't deserve it, but he didn't name names. Koko B. Ware, who worked as an undercard wrestler in WWF, is often billed as a controversial inductee since he was selected before wrestlers such as Randy Savage or Bruno Sammartino. Caleb Smith of Slam Wrestling questioned how Ware was inducted, but former WWWF World Heavyweight Champion Ivan Koloff never was before his 2017 death. 411Mania writer Steve Cook defended his Hall of Fame status since he was very popular with fans and some of his losses were historic, while Kevin Pantoja described him as "the floor for inductees".

Superstar Billy Graham publicly slammed the hall and demanded that WWE remove him from it, due to the 2011 induction of Abdullah the Butcher. Graham wrote: "It is a shameless organization to induct a bloodthirsty animal such as Abdullah the Butcher into their worthless and embarrassing Hall of Fame and I want the name of Superstar Billy Graham to be no part of it". In 2018, Bret Hart, who headlined the 2006 ceremony, criticized the omissions of several wrestlers, primarily Dynamite Kid and his brother Owen, as well as the inductions of the likes of The Rock 'n' Roll Express and The Fabulous Freebirds, who experienced little success in WWE. Hart said he would not go to another ceremony until WWE inducts "proper, deserving candidates". However, Hart attended the 2019 ceremony as he was inducted for a second time as part of The Hart Foundation. Hart also asked WWE to remove Goldberg from the Hall of Fame, stating that "he got in there for hurting everybody he worked with" (which included himself in 1999). In 2021, after the January 6 United States Capitol attack, Mick Foley asked Vince McMahon to remove Donald Trump from the Hall of Fame though it ultimately did not occur.

Dave Scherer of PWInsider'' has questioned how WWE can sustain the 2004–present Hall of Fame model, due to legends being rapidly inducted. He wrote: "There are only so many people that they can have headline a class. They really need to make more new stars to ensure that they can keep filling arenas for the ceremony". 411Mania's Ryan Byers said WWE standards are "weird" since several inductees have Hall of Fame careers, but others "made it in for political reasons, longstanding loyalty to the promotion".

Praise and criticism 
Owen Hart's widow, Martha Hart, responded to calls for him to be inducted by stating: "They don’t even have a Hallway of Fame. It doesn’t exist. There’s nothing. It’s a fake entity. There’s nothing real or tangible. It’s just an event they have to make money. They put it on TV and have a celebration, and it’s just so ridiculous. I would never even entertain it. It’s garbage." Sabu also criticized the Hall of Fame, saying "I'd only do it because I need the money... I don't consider it a real Hall of Fame". 

Others have offered praise for the Hall of Fame. World Wrestling Council promoter and 26-time WWC Universal Heavyweight Champion Carlos Colón Sr. said that his 2014 induction was a "realization of a dream". Arn Anderson, who was inducted in 2012 as part of The Four Horsemen, said that the induction was the "pinnacle of [his] wrestling life". 2015 Hall of Fame headliner Kevin Nash stated that two things in the professional wrestling business are real: "When you win your first championship and when you get inducted into the Hall of Fame". Nash claimed this is a sentiment to which colleague Ric Flair also subscribes. During his 2013 induction, future U.S. president Donald Trump said that the honor meant more than "having the highest ratings in TV, being a best-selling author or getting a spot on the Hollywood Walk of Fame".

See also
 WWE Hall of Fame statue

References

External links

Awards established in 1993

Hall of Fame
Professional wrestling halls of fame
 
Hall of Fame